The Ballon d'Or Féminin, also known as the Women's Ballon d'Or, is an association football award presented by France Football that honours the player deemed to have performed the best over the previous season. It was first awarded in 2018, with Ada Hegerberg of Norway becoming the inaugural recipient of the award. In 2022, Barcelona captain Alexia Putellas became the first and only player to win the award twice and in consecutive years.

Winners

Wins by player

Wins by country

Wins by club

See also

 List of sports awards honoring women
 The Best FIFA Women's Player
 FIFA Women's World Player of the Year
 The Best FIFA Football Awards

References 

Awards established in 2018
Ballon d'Or
Women's association football player of the year awards
France Football awards